Moses Somake ( – ) was a British architect known for designing several prominent buildings in British India. His works, built before the Partition of India and located in modern-day Pakistan, include the Edward House, BVS Parsi High School, Karachi Goan Association building, Khaliq Dina Hall, Mules Mansion and Quaid-e-Azam House.

Early life and career
Somake was born on 6 June 1875 in Lahore, Punjab Province, British India, to a Jewish family of mixed Sephardi (from Spain) and Mizrahi (from Iraq) origin.

He spent most of his life in the city of Karachi before migrating to the United Kingdom in the mid-1940s.

Somake died in London, England, on 6 April 1947 from a cardiac arrest.

See also 

 History of the Jews in the United Kingdom
 British Jews
 History of the Jews in Pakistan
 Sephardi Jews 
 History of the Jews in Spain
 Mizrahi Jews
 History of the Jews in Iraq

References

1875 births
1947 deaths
British Jews
British people of Spanish-Jewish descent
British people of Iraqi-Jewish descent
Architects from Lahore
Jewish Pakistani history
Architects in British India